The 2015–16 NBL season is the 38th season for the Illawarra Hawks in the NBL. Following two seasons without making the playoffs, the Hawks enlisted the services of championship winning coach Rob Beveridge in an attempt to win the championship.

Off-season
Illawarra Hawks announced the re-signing of key players Rhys Martin, Oscar Forman, Tyson Demos, Larry Davidson, and club MVP Tim Coenraad.

Additions

Subtractions

Current roster

Depth chart

Regular season

Standings

Game log

|- style="background-color:#ffcccc;"
| 1
| 8 October
| @ Cairns
| L 74–79
| Kirk Penney (12)
| Andrew Ogilvy (9)
| Tim Coenraad (9)
| Cairns Convention Centre  –
| 0–1
|- style="background-color:#ffcccc;"
| 2
| 11 October 
| @ Melbourne
| L 81–93
| Andrew Ogilvy (20) 
| Andrew Ogilvy (15)
| Kevin White (5)
| Hisense Arena  –
| 0–2
|- style="background-color:#ccffcc;"
| 3
| 14 October
| NZ Breakers
| W 96–75
| Kirk Penney (36)
| Andrew Ogilvy (10)
| Tyson Demos (5)
| WIN Entertainment Centre  –
| 1–2
|- style="background-color:#ccffcc;"
| 4
| 17 October
| @ Sydney
| W 100–86
| Oscar Forman (24)
| Oscar Forman (10)
| Andrew Ogilvy (6)
| Sydney Entertainment Centre  –
| 2–2
|- style="background-color:#ffcccc;"
| 5
| 25 October
| Perth
| L 99–106
| Andrew Ogilvy (21)
| Oscar Forman (6)
| Kevin Lisch (7)
| WIN Entertainment Centre  –
| 2–3
|- style="background-color:#ccffcc;"
| 6
| 28 October
| @ Townsville
| W 96–88
| Andrew Ogilvy (28)
| Andrew Ogilvy (13)
| Kirk Penney (5)
| Townsville Entertainment Centre  –
| 3–3

Finals

Player statistics

Regular season

Finals

Awards

Player of the Week

Player of the Month

Coach of the Month

See also
 2015–16 NBL season

References

External links
Official Site of the Hawks

2015–16 NBL season
2015–16 NBL season by team
2015–16 in Australian basketball
Illawarra Hawks seasons

es:Wollongong Hawks
fr:Wollongong Hawks
it:Wollongong Hawks
ja:ウロンゴン・ホークス